The Honourable Anna Maria Heywood, Lady Barlow  (1873 – 28 May 1965) was an English welfare reformer and Liberal Party politician.

Education and family
Anna Maria Heywood Denman was born in 1873 in Liverpool, the daughter of the Hon. Richard Denman and Helen McMicking. Her brother was Thomas Denman, 3rd Baron Denman. She was educated privately. In 1895 she married John Emmott Barlow, the Liberal MP for Frome in Somerset and senior partner in his family businesses with principal interests in textiles, tea and coffee and rubber. They had two sons and two daughters. Her son John who succeeded his father to become the second baronet was Liberal candidate for Northwich in 1929. He later became a National Liberal representing Eddisbury from 1945–1950 and then a fully fledged Conservative being MP for Middleton and Prestwich from 1951–1966. In religion, Sir John and Lady Barlow were Quakers, Lady Barlow having converted to that denomination in about 1911.

Politics
Lady Barlow was a steadfast companion to her husband in his Somerset constituency over many years. She shared his political interests and campaigned with him and on his behalf. The couple were close friends of Liberal Prime Minister Sir Henry Campbell-Bannerman. She also stood in her own right for election to the House of Commons twice as a Liberal. First she contested the Derbyshire, High Peak division at the 1922 general election. At this election only thirty-three women were selected as candidates out of 1,387 contenders for the House of Commons’ 615 seats   and only two, the Tory Lady Astor and the Liberal Margaret Wintringham were elected. Lady Barlow came third at High Peak in a three-cornered contest with 20% of the vote.  

She next fought the nearby seat of Ilkeston at the 1924 general election. The number of women candidates was growing now but there was a still a real sense in which they were pioneers. Overall only forty-one women were chosen to stand for election and Lady Barlow was one of only six female candidates out of a total of 333 Liberal hopefuls. Again she came third in a three-cornered race.

A champion of the political rights of women, Lady Barlow was also a strong supporter of the traditional Liberal policy of free trade and shared her husband's close interest in labour affairs.

In her later life during the 1950s and 60s, at a time when the Liberal Party had declined in public affections, Lady Barlow seems to have transferred her political allegiance to the National Liberals. Her son, the second baronet, was of course a National Liberal and later a Conservative MP, which must have been an influence upon her. She does not appear to have been politically active in campaigning for National Liberal candidates but did support a large number of their social and fundraising functions, as well as attending talks at meetings of the National Liberal Forum.

Welfare reformer
Lady Barlow was active in a number of different fields of moral, welfare and political reform. For 22 years she was President of the Lancashire and Cheshire Band of Hope Union an organisation dedicated to teaching and impressing upon children the importance and principles of sobriety and teetotalism. In addition, she appeared as a speaker for other temperance groups including The Young Abstainers Union. Outside her own electoral campaigning, Lady Barlow supported for the cause of women's suffrage and as a Quaker she was a campaigner for peace and disarmament. She and her husband opposed the introduction of conscription both before  and more crucially during the First World War and sent their sons to a Quaker college in the United States. Lady Barlow particularly tried to promote peaceful international relations and reconciliation during and after the Great War. To this end she maintained an extensive correspondence with influential figures throughout Europe and maintained a speaking schedule at related events at home such as the Peacemakers’ Pilgrimage Rally in Hyde Park in 1926.

Papers
A number of Lady Barlow's papers and letters are contained in the Barlow Collection deposited in the Cambridge University Library, Manuscripts Departments.

References

1873 births
1965 deaths
Liberal Party (UK) parliamentary candidates
Converts to Quakerism
English women in politics
English suffragists
English temperance activists
English Quakers
Wives of baronets